The Anglican Diocese of  Ekiti Kwara is one of eight within the Anglican Province of Kwara, itself one of 14 provinces within the Church of Nigeria. The see is currently vacant, as the pioneer Bishop Andrew Ajayi. It was recently translated to Ekiti Anglican Diocese.

Notes

Dioceses of the Province of Kwara
 
Ekiti Kwara